Amahl and the Night Visitors is a 1957 Australian TV play. It was a filmed version of the opera Amahl and the Night Visitors by Menotti. The ABC had previously televised Menotti's The Telephone and this was the second opera they broadcast.

It was broadcast live in Melbourne, recorded, then shown in Sydney. It was presented by members of the Elizabethan Theatre Trust's Australian Opera Company and the Victorian Symphony Orchestra under the direction of Joseph Post.

See also
List of live television plays broadcast on Australian Broadcasting Corporation (1950s)

External links

References

1950s Australian television plays
Australian television plays based on operas
Australian Broadcasting Corporation original programming
English-language television shows
Australian live television shows
Black-and-white Australian television shows
1957 television plays